Ceragenix Pharmaceuticals, Inc. is a biopharmaceutical company headquartered in Denver, Colorado that develops prescription therapies based on a platform of proprietary surface active technologies—skin Barrier Repair Technology (BRT) and Cerageninis, a new class of broad spectrum anti-infectives. The company discovers, develops and commercializes anti-infective drugs based on its proprietary class of compounds, Ceragenins. Active against a range of gram positive and gram negative bacteria, these agents are being developed as anti-infective medical device coatings and as therapeutics for antibiotic-resistant organisms.

Products
Ceragenix developed EpiCeram, a topical non-steroidal skin care cream based on the research of Peter Elias for the treatment of atopic dermatitis (eczema). 

Ceragenix's second platform technology addresses multidrug resistant bacterial and viral infections. The anti-infective technology is based on the research of Dr. Paul B. Savage, Professor and Associate Chair of Departments of Chemistry and Biochemistry at Brigham Young University (BYU, Provo, Utah).  These compounds are aminosterols that mimic the activity of the naturally occurring antimicrobial peptides which form part of the human immune system and early line of defense against bacterial, viruses, fungi and certain cancers.  The Ceragenins have been the subject of in vitro analysis and have demonstrated a range of action against methicillin-resistant Staphylococcus aureus (MRSA), vancomycin-resistant Staphylococcus aureus (VRSA), tobramycin-resistant Pseudomonas aeruginosa (PATR), Escherichia coli, vaccinia virus, HIV, and Bacillus anthracis (anthrax) among others.  The compounds work by breaching the outer membranes of their targets.  The compounds are positively charged and are electrostatically attracted to the negatively charged phospholipids that tend to distinguish prokaryotic from eukaryotic cells.

References

External links 
 Innovations & Ideas." Denver Post. 
 Ceragenix Pharmaceuticals Gets Frost & Sullivan Product Innovation Award for Cerashield Coating – Wireless News | HighBeam Research 
 CERAGENIX PHARMACEUTICALS SHOWS NET LOSS FOR 3rd QUARTER – US Fed News Service, Including US State News | HighBeam Research 

Pharmaceutical companies of the United States
Companies based in Denver
Health care companies based in Colorado